Operation Resolve may refer to:
The South African search for the wreckage of South African Airways Flight 295 in 1987–1988
The police investigation into the 1989 Hillsborough disaster in the United Kingdom, which began in 2012